The Irishman (Original Motion Picture Soundtrack) is the soundtrack album to the 2019 film The Irishman directed by Martin Scorsese. The film score is written and composed by Scorsese's norm collaborator Robbie Robertson who also compiled the soundtrack with music supervisor Randall Poster. It features both original and existing music tracks. Sony Music Entertainment released the soundtrack digitally on November 1, 2019 and through physical formats on November 29. In addition, a vinyl edition album which was specially cut at Abbey Road Studios, London was released on February 7, 2020.

Development 
{{Blockquote|text="The film spans many decades, and we had song ideas that we wanted to use for the different periods. When we started breaking it down into time periods, it all grew from there. We also started thinking about what would work as counterpoint, or what would not be the obvious choice. That’s where we started, and when it came time to figure out the score, Marty said, 'Rule number one is that it can’t sound like movie music.' [...] That eliminated a lot of possibilities, so I had to go to a musical headspace that I had never been before. It works beautifully in the movie."|source=Robbie Robertson on compiling the soundtrack for The Irishman in an interview with Vulture.}}
Speaking to Rolling Stone, Robertson said, "This is probably the tenth film I've worked on with Marty [Scorsese], and every time we do it, it's a whole new experience ... The music score for The Irishman was an unusual feat. We were trying to discover a sound, a mood, a feel, that could work, over the many decades that this story takes place." Robertson also wrote the score for the film, although only his "Theme for the Irishman" appears on the soundtrack. Two tracks Robertson wrote for the film that appear in the credits, "I Hear You Paint Houses" and "Remembrance" featuring Frederic Yonnet on the diatonic harmonica, were earlier included on his studio album Sinematic, which released on the same year in September. 

 Track listing 

 Charts 

 Release history 

 Accolades 

In December 2019, IndieWire reported that Robertson would be ineligible for an Oscar nomination for his original music used in the film (along with Captain Marvel and Knives Out'') due to the presence of too many high-profile hit singles featured in the film's soundtrack. Robertson however nominated for Original Score awards at the Critics' Choice and Satellite Awards respectively.

References

External links 

 

2019 soundtrack albums
Robbie Robertson albums
Drama film soundtracks
Crime film soundtracks
Sony Music soundtracks
Various artists albums
Compilation albums by American artists